Kaag en Braassem is a municipality in the western Netherlands, in the province of South Holland. It was formed on 1 January  2009, through the merger of Alkemade and Jacobswoude.

Kaag en Braassem consists of 10 towns: 

In addition, there are 5 hamlets:

Topography

Dutch topographic map of the municipality of Kaag en Braassem, June 2015

Notable people 

 Marinus Heijnes (1888 – 1963 in De Kaag) a Dutch impressionist artist of the Hague School

Sport 
 Cornelis van Staveren (1889 in Leimuiden – 1982) a sailor who competed at the 1928 Summer Olympics
 Joop Zoetemelk (born 1946) a retired professional racing cyclist, raised in Rijpwetering
 Monique Velzeboer (born in Oud Ade 1969) a Dutch skater and photographer, medallist in the 1998 Winter Olympics
 Michael Buskermolen (born 1972 in Leimuiden) a Dutch retired footballer with 399 club caps with AZ Alkmaar
 Bob de Jong (born 1976 in Leimuiden) a Dutch former speed skater, silver, gold and twice bronze medallist at the 1998 2006 2010 and 2014 Winter Olympics
 Margot Boer (born 1985 in Woubrugge) a Dutch former speed skater, competed in the 2010 and 2014 Winter Olympics
 Claudia van den Heiligenberg (born 1985 in Roelofarendsveen) a Dutch footballer
 Femke Heemskerk (born 1987 in Roelofarendsveen) a Dutch competitive swimmer, gold and silver medallist at the 2008 and 2012 Summer Olympics

Gallery

References

External links 
 Official website

 
Municipalities of South Holland
Municipalities of the Netherlands established in 2009